New Jersey Transit Bus Operations, under the NJ Transit Mercer, Inc. subsidiary, as successor to Mercer Metro, operates the following routes within Mercer County, New Jersey.

Routes
All of these routes are exact fare lines and are operated out of the Hamilton Township garage.

Former routes

References

External links
New Jersey Transit - Bus

 600
Lists of New Jersey bus routes